Purbba Gopalpur is a  village in the Panskua CD block in the Tamluk subdivision of the Purba Medinipur district in the state of West Bengal, India.

Geography

Location

Urbanisation
94.08% of the population of Tamluk subdivision live in the rural areas. Only 5.92% of the population live in the urban areas, and that is the second lowest proportion of urban population amongst the four subdivisions in Purba Medinipur district, just above Egra subdivision.

Note: The map alongside presents some of the notable locations in the subdivision. All places marked in the map are linked in the larger full screen map.

Demographics
According to the 2011 Census of India, Purbba Gopalpur had a total population of 1,110, of which 574 (52%) were males and 536 (49%) were females. There were 101 persons in the age range of 0–6 years. The total number of literate persons in Purbba Goplapur was 849 (89.14% of the population over 6 years).

Purbba Gopalpur picture gallery

References

Villages in Purba Medinipur district